Tourist in Paradise is the third album by the American Jazz group The Rippingtons, released in 1989 for the GRP label. The album is primarily the work of Russ Freeman, who acted as producer, arranger, and composer.
Tourist in Paradise reached #4 on Billboard's Jazz chart.

Track listing
All tracks composed by Russ Freeman except where noted
"Tourist in Paradise" - 5:39
"Jupiter's Child" - 5:17
"Aruba!" - 4:15
"One Summer Night in Brazil" - 6:28
"Earthbound" - 4:37
"Let's Stay Together" (Willie Mitchell, Al Green, Al Jackson) - 4:47
"One Ocean Way" - 4:19
"Destiny" - 5:40
"The Princess" - 3:08

Personnel 

The Rippingtons
 Russ Freeman – acoustic guitar, electric guitar, guitar synthesizer, synthesizers, programming, Linn 9000 drum programming, arrangements 
 Steve Bailey – bass
 Tony Morales – cymbal & hi-hat (1, 2, 3, 5, 6, 8), drums (4, 7, 9)
 Steve Reid –  percussion, soundscapes 
 Brandon Fields –  alto saxophone (1, 2, 5-9), soprano saxophone (4)

Additional musicians
 Rob Mullins – keyboards (3)
 Carl Anderson – vocals (1, 2, 3)

Production 
 Russ Freeman – producer, recording, mixing, digital editing 
 Dave Grusin – executive producer 
 Larry Rosen – executive producer
 Steve Reid – recording, mixing
 Ted Blaisdell – additional engineer
 Micajah Ryan – additional engineer
 Ted Jensen – mastering 
 Mastered at Sterling Sound (New York City, New York).
 Suzanne Sherman – production coordinator 
 Andy Baltimore – creative director, graphic design 
 Bill Mayer – front cover artwork 
 David Gibb – graphic design
 Dave Kunze – graphic design
 Dan Serrano – graphic design
 Chris Cuffaro – photography

Charts

References

External links
The Rippingtons - Tourist in Paradise at AllMusic
The Rippingtons - Tourist in Paradise at Discogs
The Rippingtons Official Website

1989 albums
The Rippingtons albums
GRP Records albums